Acrocercops malvacea is a moth of the family Gracillariidae, known from Morocco. It was described by Walsingham, Lord Thomas de Grey, in 1907. The hostplant for the species is Lavatera olbia and Malva species.

References

malvacea
Endemic fauna of Morocco
Moths described in 1907
Moths of Africa